Is Your Love Strong Enough may refer to:

"Is Your Love Strong Enough", song written by Bryan Ferry from Legend (Tangerine Dream soundtrack), also from More than This (compilation album)
"Is Your Love Strong Enough", cover of the Bryan Ferry song from The Girl with the Dragon Tattoo (2011 film) soundtrack by How To Destroy Angels
"Is Your Love Strong Enough", song from Pop Life (Bananarama album) written Dallin and Jolley